Mass Rapid Transit in Malaysia can refer to:
 Klang Valley Mass Rapid Transit (KVMRT), a rapid transit system in Greater Kuala Lumpur
 Johor Bahru–Singapore Rapid Transit System (RTS Link), a cross-border rapid transit system linking Johor Bahru and Singapore
 Mass Rapid Transit Corporation (Malaysia), the developer and asset owner of both of the Mass Rapid Transit project

See also 
 Mass Rapid Transit (disambiguation)
 MRT (disambiguation)
 Rapid transit (disambiguation)